Marek 'mRqS' Szulen (born 28 August 1975) - Polish composer of electronic music (el-music). Director of Festival Of Electronic Music "KOMP" in Kwidzyn, Poland.
Currently, living and recording in the Netherlands.

Discography
"Ankaria" - rel. 1999 
"Creation - Universal Consciousness" - rel. 2002 r. dedicated to human beings from planet Erra in Pleiades star cluster

See also
New-age music
Electronic music
Kayanis
Jean Michel Jarre

External links
http://www.figu.org
https://web.archive.org/web/20041214015559/http://marekszulen.net/
https://web.archive.org/web/20050124063819/http://rc.marekszulen.net/

1975 births
Living people
People from Kwidzyn
Polish composers